Yio Chu Kang Bus Interchange is a bus interchange in the northern part of Ang Mo Kio, Singapore. The interchange is located beneath Yio Chu Kang MRT station. Boarding berths are located north of Yio Chu Kang MRT station concourse while and alighting berths are located south. Formerly known as a bus terminal, it was renamed as a bus interchange on 1 August 2013. Expansion works started in December 2018 and were completed in 2019.

Accidents
On 23 April 2018 at around 9.30am, three pedestrians were killed after being hit by a lorry. Also involved was a stationary bus at the traffic junction near the exit of the bus interchange.

Bus Contracting Model

Under the new bus contracting model, all the bus routes were split into 4 bus packages - 13 under Bedok, 825 under Sembawang-Yishun, 72 under Tampines with the rest under Seletar Bus Packages.

References

External links
 Interchanges and Terminals (SBS Transit)
 Interchange/Terminal (SMRT Buses)
 

Bus stations in Singapore
Buildings and structures in Ang Mo Kio
Transport in North-East Region, Singapore